This is a list of submissions to the 94th Academy Awards for the Best International Feature Film. The Academy of Motion Picture Arts and Sciences (AMPAS) has invited the film industries of various countries to submit their best film for the Academy Award for Best International Feature Film every year since the award was created in 1956. The award is presented annually by the Academy to a feature-length motion picture produced outside the United States that contains primarily non-English dialogue. The International Feature Film Award Committee oversees the process and reviews all the submitted films. The category was previously called the Best Foreign Language Film, but this was changed in April 2019 to Best International Feature Film, after the Academy deemed the word "Foreign" to be outdated.

For the 94th Academy Awards, the submitted motion pictures must be first released theatrically in their respective countries between 1 January 2021 and 31 December 2021. The deadline for submissions to the Academy was 1 November 2021, with a total of 93 countries submitting a film. Somalia submitted a film for the first time, with Algeria, Bhutan, and Uzbekistan all resubmitting their films disqualified from last year's list. On 6 December 2021, the Academy confirmed the list of the 93 eligible films. Jordan withdrew their film on 9 December 2021, leaving 92 eligible entries.

The shortlist of fifteen finalists was announced on 21 December 2021. The final five nominees were announced on 8 February 2022. Drive My Car by Ryusuke Hamaguchi won the award for Japan.

Submissions

Notes
  The Jordanian film Amira was withdrawn by the Royal Film Commission of Jordan due to controversy surrounding the film's subject matter. The film, which centers on a Palestinian girl who learns her real father was an Israeli prison guard rather than a Palestinian prisoner, was criticized by prisoners' rights organisations and withdrawn "out of respect to the feelings of the prisoners and their families. " In the past, AMPAS has refused to accept withdrawals for political reasons, and there was no official announcement whether Amira was actually withdrawn from Oscar consideration. 
  Lithuania initially reported that The Jump by Giedrė Žickytė was their selection, but Isaac by Jurgis Matulevičius was ultimately submitted.
  Namibia formed an approved Oscar Selection Committee for the first time. On 14 December, the Namibia Film Commission issued a press release noting that they had received four submissions but that they "did not meet the qualifying criteria as set out by the Academy."
  Nigeria launched an open call for submissions but later announced that they would not enter the race "due to the fact that the films received so far for screening failed the eligibility rule test set by the Academy".
  The Film Academy of the Philippines did not submit a film for the first time since 2005, citing funding issues and problems due to the COVID-19 pandemic. Directors' Guild of the Philippines, Inc. publicly expressed "great disappointment" that the Film Academy of the Philippines made no submission. The guild noted the eligible titles Fan Girl by Antoinette Jadaone, Hayop Ka! by Avid Liongoren, On the Job: The Missing 8 by Erik Matti and Tagpuan by MacArthur Alejandre.
 The Oscar Selection Committees for Ghana, Nepal, and Pakistan all invited filmmakers to make submissions, but no films were sent. Cinemas were closed in all three countries for most or all of the eligibility period due to the COVID-19 pandemic.

References

External links
 Official website of the Academy Awards

2021 in film
94